The 1972 United States Senate election in Minnesota took place on November 7, 1972. Incumbent Democratic U.S. Senator Walter Mondale won re-election.

Democratic–Farmer–Labor primary

Candidates

Declared
 Ralph E. Franklin
 Tom Griffin
 Richard "Dick" Leaf
 Walter F. Mondale, Incumbent U.S. Senator since 1964

Results

Republican primary

Candidates

Declared
 Phil Hansen, Lutheran minister

Results

General election

Results

See also 
 United States Senate elections, 1972

References

Minnesota
1972
1972 Minnesota elections
Walter Mondale